Bentown is an unincorporated community in McLean County, Illinois, United States, named after the Benjamin family, a family that is long time residents of the area.

See also
Benjaminville, Illinois

References

Unincorporated communities in McLean County, Illinois
Unincorporated communities in Illinois